Janine Marsha Stanley (born 28 March 1991) is a Uruguayan field hockey player.

Career

Junior national team
Stanley made her debut for the Uruguayan U–21 team in 2012 at the Pan American Junior Championship in Guadalajara.

Las Cimarronas
In 2008, Stanley made her debut for Las Cimarronas at the South American Championship in Montevideo.

Since her debut, Stanley has been a mainstay in the national team. She has won three bronze medals at South American Championships, including 2008, as well as 2010 and 2013 in Rio de Janeiro and Santiago, respectively. She also won bronze at the 2014 South American Games in Santiago. 

In 2011 and 2013, Stanley was named in consecutive Pan American Elite Team by the Pan American Hockey Federation.

At the 2019 Pan American Games, Stanley was a member of the Uruguay team that finished 5th.

References

External links

1991 births
Living people
Female field hockey midfielders
Uruguayan female field hockey players
South American Games bronze medalists for Uruguay
South American Games medalists in field hockey
Competitors at the 2014 South American Games
Uruguayan people of British descent